Jean de Tournes (1593–1669) was a Swiss printer, book publisher and bookseller, and member of a long-lasting family printing business. He was the son of Jean de Tournes (1539–1615) and grandson of Jean de Tournes (1504–1564); he was the son-in-law of Samuel Crespin.

Life

Jean de Tournes was born in Geneva in 1593. He took over his father's printing and publishing business in 1615. In 1619 he sold his house at the sign of the Deux Vipères in rue Raisin, Lyon, to the printer and bookseller Guichard Julliéron. Jean de Tournes retired in 1653, and was succeeded in the family business by his sons Jean Antoine and Samuel de Tournes. He died in 1669.

The emblem of the de Tournes press was two entwined vipers.

References

1593 births
1669 deaths
Swiss printers
Swiss book publishers (people)
17th-century businesspeople from the Republic of Geneva